Pokuttia, also known as Pokuttya or Pokutia, is a historical area of East-Central Europe, situated between the Dniester and Cheremosh rivers and the Carpathian Mountains, in the southwestern part of modern Ukraine. Part of the Antean tribal alliance since the 4th century, it joined Kievan Rus' in the 10th century, and was eventually annexed by Poland in the 14th century. The region was involved in a series of wars between Poland and Moldavia, which ceased with the death of Petru Rareș, who failed to conquer the region on two occasions (1531, 1535). A last attempt to seize Pokuttia was made by John III the Terrible in 1572. At times, Polish rule caused discontent among Pokuttians. Many of them were captured and resettled to Moldavia, where they reinforced the Ukrainian element in the country. In the 1490s, a rebellion was started by Petro Mukha, only to be suppressed by 1492. The region remained under Polish rule until 1772. Although the historic heart of the area was Kolomyia, the name itself is derived from the town of Kuty that literally means 'round the corner' ("Kut" by itself means "corner").

History
The accounts of Greek and Roman historians describing the "widespread Slavic settlement" in Pokuttia have been confirmed by archaeological findings.

In the 4th century, the Slavic inhabitants of Pokuttia became part of a tribal alliance known as the Antean tribal alliance. By the 6th century they had become part of the Dulibian alliance, and in the 8th and 9th centuries they were part of the Tivertsian tribal alliance. Finally, in the 10th century, they joined Kievan Rus'. Following the Council of Liubech, Pokuttia became part of Principality of Halych.

The region was sparsely settled, but there were some towns, such as Sniatyn (named after the boyar Kostiantyn Stroslavic and first attested in 1158) and Kolomyia, first attested in 1240 in the Hypatian Codex, an Old East Slavic chronicle that is the most important source of historical data for southern Rus'.

In the early medieval period, the area was conquered by the Kingdom of Poland in 1325, and later annexed in 1349 by Casimir III of Poland.

In 1388, Władysław II Jagiełło, needing financial support for his battles against the Teutonic Knights, placed Pokuttia under the administration of Petru II of Moldavia, a Moldavian voivode, for a loan of 3,000 coins of gold.

In 1485, Moldavian prince Stephen the Great, having lost his country's access to the Black Sea the previous year to the Ottomans, was in serious need of alliances, and swore allegiance to Casimir IV Jagiellon, King of Poland, in exchange of Pokuttia, in what is known as the Colomeea oath. Casimir's successor, John I Albert of Poland, used the aforementioned treaty as a pretext to start an invasion of Moldavia itself in 1497. However, after four months of siege, he failed to take the fortress of Suceava, Moldavia's capital, and abandoning the siege, his army ran into a trap that caused many of his nobles to die (Battle of the Cosmin Forest).

In 1490, due to increased oppression of Ukrainians at the hands of the Polish, a series of successful rebellions was led by Ukrainian hero Petro Mukha, joined by other Ukrainians, including Cossacks and Hutsuls, in addition to Moldavians and Ukrainians coming from Bukovina. Known as Mukha Rebellion, this series of battles was supported by Moldavian prince Stephen the Great, and it is one of the earliest known uprisings of Ukrainians against Polish oppression. These rebellions saw the capture of various cities of Pokuttia, and reached as far west as Lviv.

In 1498, Stephen the Great, aided by the Turks and the Tatars, conducted his first campaign in Pokuttia. He conduced a second campaign in 1502, pushing the Poles beyond the Bystrytsia River. Stephan's success was in that he managed to occupy Pokuttia for a period of time during his lifetime. His son Bogdan III (1504–1517), "the one-eyed" disclaimed the region and briefly occupied it between 1509 and 1510. The voivode Petru Rareș attempted to recapture Pokuttia, but both his attempts, in 1531 and 1535, failed. The last Moldavian attempt to seize Pokuttia occurred in 1572, with John III the Terrible. The invasions of the Moldavians and the ensuing wars between Poles and Moldavians brought great distress on the population, with many Pokuttians captured and resettled in Moldavia, reinforcing the Ukrainian element in Moldavian regions like Bukovina. Kolomyia is said to have "suffered severely during the 15th and 16th centuries from the attacks of the Moldavians and the Tatars".

Throughout the Middle Ages, Obertyn was Pokuttia's main castle, while Kolomyia was the region's main market town and fair.

Pokuttia remained under Polish rule until 1772, the year in which it became part of the Austrian Empire. Ukrainian opryshoks were active in the region from the 17th to the 19th century. With the collapse of Austria-Hungary in the aftermath of World War I, the greater part of Pokuttia became part of the West Ukrainian People's Republic and disputed with Poland. Part of Poland in 1919–1939, it then passed to the Soviet Union. The area was attached to the Ukrainian Soviet Socialist Republic, falling to Nazi German control after the start of Operation Barbarossa until 1944. It was then incorporated into the Soviet controlled Western Ukrainian oblast of Ivano-Frankivsk, roughly corresponding to the southern half of the oblast. After Ukraine declared independence in 1991, the territory became part of the country.

Language 
The local Ukrainians' language was influenced by Romanian, and the Pokuttia–Bukovina dialect was formed. It is distinct from other Ukrainian dialects because all of them are influenced by other Slavic languages, while the Pokuttia–Bukovina dialect received influence from a Romance language (Romanian). The dialect preserved several archaic endings and soft declension, and certain lexical peculiarities, including Romanianisms. The expansion of ancient Pokuttian phonetic features in the 14th-16th centuries in western Podolia contributed to the formation of a broader group of Dniester dialects.

Population
Pokuttia is one of the most densely populated parts of Ukraine. The region was historically populated by Slavic tribes, which, starting from the 4th century, organized in tribal alliances. The first entity to form in the region was the Antean tribal alliance, which emerged as a union of local tribes around the 4th century. Pokuttia then joined the Dulibian and Tivertsian tribal alliances. Part of Kievan Rus' since the 10th century, it was annexed by Poland in the 14th century, and then involved in a series of conflicts between Poland and Moldavia, which ceased with the death of Petru Rareș, who failed to conquer the region on two occasions (1531, 1535). A last attempt was made by John III the Terrible in 1572. The region remained under Polish rule, which caused discontent among Pokuttians. During the wars between Poland and Moldavia, many of them were captured and resettled to Moldavia, where they reinforced the Ukrainian element there. The region remained under Polish rule until 1772.

At the time when the early censuses were made in the 18th century, 75% of the population was ethnically Ukrainian. There were also some Jews and a few Poles and Armenians. In the 1920s and 1930s, more Poles settled in the region. The Ukrainian element slightly decreased in the following years, as in 1939 the population was made up of 64% Ukrainians, 20% Poles, 9% Jews, and 7% Ukrainian-speaking Roman Catholics. In the 21st century (2000s), there were 97% Ukrainians, 2% Russians, less than 1% Poles and 0.2% Jews.

Pokuttia's population still contains today some Poles, Jews, Ukrainian Hutsuls, and it also contains some Romanians. At the 2001 census there were 600 Romanians (including self-declared Moldovans) recorded.

List of cities
 Nadvirna
 Deliatyn
 Hody-Dobrovidka
 Kobaky
 Kolomyia (Romanian: Colomeea)
 Kosiv
 Kosmach
 Kuty, Stari Kuty (Romanian: Cuturi)
 Lanchyn
 Pechenizhyn
 Obertyn (Romanian: Obertin)
 Verkhovyna
 Vorokhta
 Yabluniv
 Yaremche
 Zabolotiv

Notes

References

Sources 
 Korduba, M. ‘Moldavs’ko-pol’s’ka hranytsia na Pokutiu do smerty Stefana Velykoho,' Naukovyi zbirnyk prysviachenyi profesorovy Mykhailovy Hrushevs’komu (Lviv 1906)
 Czyżewski, J.; Koczwara, M.; Zglinicka, A. Pokucie (Lviv 1931)
 Kvitkovs’kyi, D.; Bryndzan, T.; Zhukovs’kyi, A. (eds). Bukovyna, ïï mynule i suchasne (Paris–Philadelphia–Detroit 1956)
 Koinov, M. Pryroda Stanyslavivs’koï oblasti (Lviv 1960)
 Istoriia mist i sil Ukraïns’koï RSR: Ivano-Frankivs’ka oblast’ (Kyiv 1971)

 
Historical regions in Ukraine
Moldavia
Carpathians